"Strong Baby" is a song recorded by South Korean boy band Big Bang. Released on January 1, 2009, through YG Entertainment, it served as the second single from the quintet's second studio album Remember (2008).  While the previous single "Sunset Glow" was promoted with all members, "Strong Baby" was performed solely by Seungri, the youngest member of the group.

Background 
While "Sunset Glow" was promoted with the entire group, Seungri performed "Strong Baby" independently. In order to shed the "youngest member" image from BigBang, he promoted the single with a more mature look complete with a stylized dance. He later received the triple crown on Korean music show Inkigayo. The song was later included in the Japanese version of Seungri's second extended play Let's Talk About Love (2013).

Track listing

References

External links 
 

2009 singles
2009 songs
Seungri songs
YG Entertainment singles
Korean-language songs
Songs written by G-Dragon